Onat Kutlar (25 January 1936 – 11 January 1995) was a prominent Turkish writer and poet, founder of the Turkish Sinematek and cofounder of the Istanbul International Film Festival.

Biography
Onat Kutlar was born in Alanya, Turkey, on 25 January 1936. He was the grandson of Arif Pasha, an Ottoman governor of the Taif district and the son of Ali Riza Bey, a penal judge of the young Turkish Republic and later a farmer, and Meliha Hanim.

He was raised in Gaziantep. He studied law at Istanbul University and philosophy in Paris. His book, Ishak (1959), composed of nine short stories, most of which are written from the point of view of a child and are often surrealistic and mystical was the recipient of the 1960 "Turkish Language Association Short Story Award". According to the literary critic Fethi Naci, these short stories represent a very early example of magical realism genre. In 1985, he was a member of the jury at the 35th Berlin International Film Festival. In 1994, he was awarded with L'Ordre des Arts et des Lettres and in 1975 Cultural Medal of Poland for his work in the Turkish Sinematek.

He died on 11 January 1995 in Istanbul resulting from injuries sustained in a bomb attack (claimed by İBDA-C, later revealed to be carried out by PKK) which occurred on 30 December 1994 at The Marmara Hotel's cafeteria in Taksim Square, Istanbul. He was laid to rest at the Aşiyan Asri Cemetery. He was married to Filiz Kutlar.

The International Federation of Film Critics (FIPRESCI) Prize in the National Competition of the Istanbul International Film Festival is named after him to commemorate his contributions to the Turkish cinema.

Bibliography

Poetry
 Peralı Bir Aşk Için Divan (Divan for a Pera Love), 1981
 Unutulmuş Kent (Forgotten City), 1986, translated into French as La Ville Oubliée published by Royaumont

Essays and short stories
 Yeter ki Kararmasin (Just Let It Not Get Dark), 1984
 Sinema Bir Senliktir (The Cinema Is a Feast), 1985
 Bahar Isyancidir (Spring is Rebellious), 1986
 Gundemdeki Sanatci, 1995
 Gundemdeki Konu, 1995

Collection of short stories
 Ishak, 1959, translated into Persian,  Transl.: Çuka Çekad. Kalagh-e Sefid, Iran 2008, 
(A story in Ishak called "Yunus" was published in English in the United States in Grand Street magazine (Winter, 1995)).

Screenplays
 Yer Çekimli Aşklar (1995) (screenplay)
 Hakkari'de Bir Mevsim (1983) based on the novel 'O' by Ferit Edgu, aka A Season in Hakkari (International: English title), aka Eine Saison in Hakkari (German) directed by Erden Kiral
 Hazal (1979) directed by Ali Özgentürk
 Yusuf ile Kenan (1979) directed by Ömer Kavur

Filmography

Producer
 Robert's Movie (1992) (producer)
 Kuyucakli Yusuf
 Menekse Koyu (1991) (executive producer), aka Violbukten
 Turkuaz (Documentary)
 Simurg (Documentary)

Actor
 Yilmaz Güney: Adana-Paris (1995)

Awards
Ishak (1959)

Turkish Language Association Short Story Award (1960)

Hakkari'de Bir Mevsim (1983) 
 C.I.C.A.E. Award - Honorable Mention
 FIPRESCI Prize Competition
 Interfilm Award - Otto Dibelius Film Award Competition
 Silver Berlin Bear  Special Jury Prize Berlin Film Festival
 Nominated Golden Berlin Bear

Hazal (1980)
 San Sebastián International Film Festival—Best New Director Ali Özgentürk
 Prades Film Festival, First Prize
 Manheim Film Festival, Golden Ducat Award
 Mannheim Film Festival, Ecumenical Jury Award
 Mannheim Film Festival, Audience Award
Den Haag Film Festival, First Prize

Yusuf ile Kenan (1979)
Milano Film Festival

Medals
L'Ordre des Arts et des Lettres, (1994)
Cultural Medal of Poland, (1975)

See also
 List of assassinated people from Turkey

References

External links
 Ykykultur.com.tr - Biography of Onat Kutlar 
 Bilgicenneti.com - Biographies: Biography of Onat Kutlar 
 
 The New York Times - Movies
 Grand Street, Yunus

1936 births
1995 deaths
Murdered Cumhuriyet columnists
Turkish male screenwriters
Turkish male poets
Turkish film producers
Magic realism writers
Burials at Aşiyan Asri Cemetery
Turkish terrorism victims
Turkish Marxists
Terrorism deaths in Turkey
People murdered in Turkey
20th-century Turkish poets
Istanbul University Faculty of Law alumni
20th-century screenwriters
Assassinated Turkish people